Virginia's 14th Senate district is one of 40 districts in the Senate of Virginia. It has been represented by Republican John Cosgrove since his victory in a 2013 special election to replace fellow Republican Harry Blevins.

Geography
District 14 contains parts of several counties and independent cities in the southern Hampton Roads area, including Isle of Wight County, Southampton County, and the cities of Chesapeake, Franklin, Portsmouth, Suffolk, and Virginia Beach. 

The district overlaps with Virginia's 2nd, 3rd, and 4th congressional districts, and with the 21st, 64th, 75th, 76th, 77th, 78th, 79th, 80th, 81st, and 84th districts of the Virginia House of Delegates. It borders the state of North Carolina.

Recent election results

2019

2015

2013 special

2011

Federal and statewide results in District 14

Historical results
All election results below took place prior to 2011 redistricting, and thus were under different district lines.

2007

2003

2001 special

1999

1997 special

1995

References

Virginia Senate districts
Chesapeake, Virginia
Franklin, Virginia
Isle of Wight County, Virginia
Portsmouth, Virginia
Southampton County, Virginia
Suffolk, Virginia
Virginia Beach, Virginia